Xenophage: Alien Bloodsport is a fighting game written for DOS, by Apogee Software. It was originally released as shareware in 1995. The game was best known for calling all its fatalities (which consisted of mostly decapitations) "Meat", with the announcer yelling "Meat" after every fatality was performed. The game was also known for Barney the Dinosaur being a playable character.

Xenophage was discontinued on November 6, 2003, and was re-released as freeware on April 24, 2006.

Plot

An extraterrestrial organization known as the "Council" abducts several individuals, including two humans, from various planets due to the aggressive tendencies demonstrated by their species. Trapped Inside a spaceship, they are ordered to engage in unarmed combat with each other inside holographic simulations of their homeworlds, for the amusement of the Council. Should any of the combatants fail during combat, their homeworld will be destroyed.

Reception

References

External links
Official Webpage

1995 video games
Apogee games
DOS games
DOS-only games
Fighting games
Freeware games
Video games about death games
Video games about extraterrestrial life
Video games developed in the United States
Video games scored by Bobby Prince
Video games with pre-rendered 3D graphics